Luk Yeung Sun Chuen is a private housing estate adjacent to the MTR Tsuen Wan station, Tsuen Wan, New Territories, Hong Kong. It comprises 17 high-rise buildings with a total of 4000 flats. It was developed in 1983 and 1984 by a consortium of property developers, including MTR Corporation, Hong Kong Land, Jardine Matheson Holdings, Kiu Kwong Investment and Dah Sing Group.

The MTR Tsuen Wan Depot is located underneath Luk Yeung Sun Chuen.

History
In 1977, the Mass Transit Railway Corporation (MTRC) began seeking developers with whom to form a joint venture responsible for developing the airspace above the Tsuen Wan Extension railway depot. In 1979, MTRC awarded the contract to build the depot, including the columns and podium slab for the topside development, to the Dragages Coignet Joint Venture. 

The residential blocks received their respective occupation permits during 1983 and 1984.

Demographics
According to the 2016 by-census, Luk Yeung Sun Chuen had a population of 10,742. The median age was 43.6 and the majority of residents (94 per cent) were of Chinese ethnicity. The average household comprised 2.9 persons. The median monthly household income of all households (i.e. including both economically active and inactive households) was HK$36,440.

Politics
Luk Yeung Sun Chuen is located in Luk Yeung constituency of the Tsuen Wan District Council. It was formerly represented by Roy Pun Long-chung, who was elected in the 2019 elections until July 2021.

Facilities
Luk Yeung Galleria is a major shopping centre owned by the MTR Corporation. The estate is also home to Liu Po Shan Memorial College and Kwai-ming Wu Memorial School of the Precious Blood.

Education 
Luk Yeung Sun Chuen is in Primary One Admission (POA) School Net 62, which includes schools in Tsuen Wan and areas nearby. The net includes multiple aided schools and one government school, Hoi Pa Street Government Primary School.

Tsuen Wan Depot

The Tsuen Wan Depot was built in 1982 to house and maintain MTR M-Train EMU trains serving on the Tsuen Wan line. This depot is capable of housing 40 trains, and cleaning of trains as well as minor and major inspections of trains are carried out in this depot.

From 1998 to 2001, all MTR M-Train EMU trains were refurbished at this depot under the supervision of United Goninan, the company responsible for the project.

References

1983 establishments in Hong Kong
Private housing estates in Hong Kong
Tsuen Wan
MTR Corporation
Hongkong Land
Jardine Matheson Group
Residential buildings completed in 1983
Residential buildings completed in 1984